Consolação is a municipality in Minas Gerais, Brazil.

References

Municipalities in Minas Gerais